Hyllestad Church is a parish church of the Church of Norway in Hyllestad Municipality in Vestland county, Norway. It is located in the village of Hyllestad. It is one of the three churches for the Hyllestad parish which is part of the Sunnfjord prosti (deanery) in the Diocese of Bjørgvin. The white, wooden church was built in a long church design in 1880 using plans drawn up by the architect Johannes Henrik Nissen. The church seats about 300 people.

History

The earliest existing historical records of the church date back to the year 1322, but the church was not new that year. Legend has it that Olav Kyrre may have built a church here in the 11th century, but there is no evidence to prove this. The exact date of the original construction is not known, but the baptismal font in the church is dated from the 12th century, so it is quite possible the church was built at that time. In 1681, the old building was torn down and replaced by a timber-framed long church. The new church had a nave that measured  and a choir that measured . The church had a tower about the  church porch. In 1720, the church received a new tower spire.

By the mid- to late-1800s, the space at the old church site and cemetery was too small and could not be expanded. In 1880, a new church site was chosen at Myklebust, a little to the south of the old church site (where the present village of Hyllestad is located). The old church was torn down and the cemetery and stone fence that encircled the yard were left in place, but it was no longer used.

The new Hyllestad Church is a wooden, basilica style church. It was designed by Henrik Nissen and the lead builder was John Alver. The building was consecrated on 23 November 1880. Originally, the church was painted yellow on the exterior, but more recently it has been painted white.

See also
List of churches in Bjørgvin

References

Hyllestad
Churches in Vestland
Long churches in Norway
Wooden churches in Norway
19th-century Church of Norway church buildings
Churches completed in 1880
12th-century establishments in Norway